Stal Rzeszów may refer to:

Stal Rzeszów (multi-sports club)
Stal Rzeszów (football)
Stal Rzeszów (motorcycle speedway)